Irén Orosz-Árva (born 29 March 1951) is a Hungarian sprinter. She competed in the women's 200 metres at the 1980 Summer Olympics.

References

1951 births
Living people
Athletes (track and field) at the 1972 Summer Olympics
Athletes (track and field) at the 1980 Summer Olympics
Hungarian female sprinters
Olympic athletes of Hungary
Place of birth missing (living people)
Olympic female sprinters